South Bisbee is a populated place situated in Cochise County, Arizona, United States, just north of the international border with Mexico.

References

Populated places in Cochise County, Arizona